Bill Koch may refer to:

Bill Koch (businessman) (born 1940), American businessman and yachtsman who won 1992 America's Cup
Bill Koch (skier) (born 1955), American cross-country skier
Bill Koch (American football), football coach

See also
Billy Koch (born 1974), American baseball player